Miquel Costa i Llobera (born 10 March 1854 in Pollença, Spain; deceased 16 October 1922 in Palma de Mallorca, Spain), was a Spanish poet from Majorca, who mainly wrote in Catalan language. He is regarded as a prominent figure of Catalan poetry.

Biography 
Born in the Majorcan town of Pollença, Spain, in 1854, he was the son of a family of rural owners and was orphaned as a mother at the age of eleven. He grew up very influenced by his uncle, a medical doctor in Pollença, who introduced him to the local landscape and the interest in the classical literature.

He was a disciple of the  writer Josep Lluís Pons i Gallarza, and studied in Madrid and Barcelona, where he met Antoni Rubió i Lluch. In 1874 he won an award at the Floral Games. He cultivated, in a first stage, romantic poetry, exemplified in his best-known poem, Lo pi de Formentor (1875), an ode to a pine tree of Formentor, which later inspired artists such as Joan Miró or Anglada Camarasa. This ode was also included in his volume Poesies, published in 1885.

He devoted much time in reading the classics, especially Horace and Virgil. In 1879 the poet composed his famous ode A Horaci ("To Horace"), which he would later publish. Meanwhile, he sent the ode to Ramon Picó i Campamar and Antoni Rubió i Lluch, the latter being the one who would issue a more favorable judgment. In addition, Rubió sent the ode to his common friend and erudite Marcelino Menéndez y Pelayo, who would decide to include it in his book Horacio en España, stating that the ode of the young Mallorcan poet was one of the purest and most beautiful sapphic odes of his time.

In 1880 he began his ecclesiastical career. In October 1885 he moved to Rome, until he received his doctorate in theology from the Pontifical Gregorian University. In 1890 he returned to the island of Mallorca.

In 1899 he published Líricas, his only volume written in Spanish, collecting poems composed during his stay in Italy, Madrid and Mallorca.  The volume was well received by friends and benefactors, mainly by Antonio Rubió y Lluch, and by critics such as Juan Valera or Marcelino Menéndez y Pelayo.

In 1902 he was given the honorific title of Mestre en Gai Saber. He was also appointed as member of the Royal Spanish Academy.

In 1906 he published his most important collection of poems, named Horacianes. These Horacianes were, therefore, a set of poems dedicated to the Latin poet Horace. With a very careful language, the poet rigorously dealt with classical poetic and literary forms. The book is made of a total of sixteen poems or odes, which attempt to reproduce in Catalan language the verse forms of Ancient Greek and Roman poetry. The book was very well received in Catalonia, and also by Spanish critics, such as Marcelino Menéndez y Pelayo, who praised the poet's metric innovations and went so far as to describe his verses as "worthy of being among the best that are written in Spain today".

The same year, he gave the inaugural address of the Barcelona Floral Games and participated in the International Congress of the Catalan Language. In 1907 he published Poesies, a revisited edition of the work he had already published in 1885.

Later in 1907, the author, accompanied by other Majorcans such as Maria Antonia Salvá, began a pilgrimage through the Middle East, which ended in Palestine and the Holy Land. Costa i Llobera kept a diary of the trip, captured in the book Visions de Palestina (1908). Thereby the poet expressed the sensations and impressions that the sacred sites produced on him. The same year, Costa i Llobera gave the inaugural address of the Jocs Florals of Girona.

After the events of the Tragic Week, the poet diminished his pace of literary production. He published two exercises of Via crucis (1907-1908) and the Sermons panegírics (1916). In 1919 he was appointed corresponding member of the Institute of Catalan Studies. At that time, he translated texts by Virgil, Petrarch, Victor Hugo and Dante Alighieri. Between 1912 and 1922 he translated the hymns of Prudentius.

In 1922, he died in Palma de Mallorca, Spain, suddenly in the pulpit, while preaching. His body was buried in the family pantheon of the cemetery of Pollença, which proclaimed him an illustrious son. The process of his beatification is open.

Notable works

 1875: The Pine of Formentor
 1885: Poesies ("Poems")
 1897: De l'agre de la terra ("From the bitterness of the earth")
 1899: Líricas (written in Spanish) 
 1900: La deixa del geni grec ("The legacy of the Greek genius")
 1903: Tradicions i fantasies ("Traditions and fantasies")
 1906: Horacianes ("Poems in the manner of Horace")
 1908: Visions de Palestina ("Visions of Palestine")
 1916: Sermons panegírics ("Panegyric sermons")

Translations:
 Himnes de Prudenci

Tribute  
In 1970, on the mountain of Montjuïc in Barcelona, the Mossèn Costa i Llobera Gardens were created, a botanical garden dedicated to the poet.

Several schools in Spain bear the name of the poet: one in the Can Caralleu neighborhood of Barcelona, another in Pollença, another in the city center of Palma and another in the municipality of Marratxí.

To commemorate the centenary of the death of the poet, the City Council of Pollença approved that the year 2022 should be proclaimed as Any Costa i Llobera.

A diocesan process began for his beatification on October 15, 1982. Recently, on January 19, 2023, Pope Francis promulgated the decree that recognized the “heroic virtues” of Costa i Llobera and declared him a Venerable Servant of God.

See also 
 Mossèn Costa i Llobera Gardens
 Catalan language poets
 Majorca

References

External links 
 Miquel Costa i Llobera - Associació d'escriptors en llengua catalana (AELC)
 
 Real Academia de la Historia - Miquel Costa i Llobera

Catalan-language writers
Catalan-language poets
Spanish poets
Spanish male poets
Translators to Catalan
Members of the Royal Spanish Academy
1854 births
1922 deaths